Natasha Margaret Kaplinsky  (born 9 September 1972) is an English newsreader, TV presenter and journalist, best known for her roles as a studio anchor on Sky News, BBC News, Channel 5 and ITV News.

After two years at Sky News, Kaplinsky joined BBC News in 2001 where she co-hosted Breakfast until 2005, when she became the host of the Six O'Clock News. In October 2007, Kaplinsky was recruited to help relaunch Five (now known as Channel 5), reportedly for the highest fee ever paid to a UK newsreader, where she presented a new look, retitled Five News with Natasha Kaplinsky for three years. After leaving Channel 5, she went on to join ITV News as a presenter.

Kaplinsky has hosted light entertainment and factual programmes during her career, including Children in Need and Born to Shine. She was also the subject of the most highly rated Who Do You Think You Are. She was the first ever winner of the first series of BBC's Strictly Come Dancing in 2004. Kaplinsky has co-founded a mother and baby company, Mum & You.

In 2014, the then PM David Cameron asked Kaplinsky to become a Holocaust Commissioner leading a project to interview 112 survivors. She was awarded an OBE in 2017 for her services to the Holocaust Commission.

In 2022, she became the latest president of the British Board of Film Classification (BBFC), after the former president, Patrick Swaffer, stepped down after a 10-year contract.

Early life
Kaplinsky was born to Raphael Kaplinsky, a South African political refugee, Professor of International Development at the Open University, and his wife, Catherine Kaplinsky (née Charlewood), a psychotherapist.

Kaplinsky's paternal grandparents were Jewish, originating from the town of Slonim (then part of Poland, now located in western Belarus), and immigrated to South Africa in 1929. Kaplinsky was born in Brighton, but spent her early life in Kenya; she has stated that she was fluent in Swahili. The family immigrated to the United Kingdom and Kaplinsky was brought up in Barcombe, East Sussex. She attended Ringmer Community College, until the age of sixteen when she moved to Varndean College in Brighton.

After graduating with a degree in English from Hertford College, Oxford in 1995, one of Kaplinsky's first jobs was working in the press offices of Labour leaders Neil Kinnock and John Smith.

Kaplinsky was the subject of an episode of the BBC's Who Do You Think You Are?, in which well-known people trace their family trees. Kaplinsky's programme was broadcast on 6 September 2007. She followed her paternal line to Slonim and was shown official documentation relating to her cousin's family. This included the death of family members during the "liquidation" – massacre – of the Słonim Ghetto by the Germans and another's escape to the partisans and eventual immigration to Australia. Her maternal line included an apothecary to King George III.

Career

Early career
Kaplinsky started out presenting on F2F, a youth chat show, for Granada Talk TV in 1996 with co-host Sacha Baron Cohen. She then moved to presenting early morning news bulletins at Meridian. Within six months, she was co-presenting their evening news programme Meridian Tonight. In 1999, Kaplinsky moved to ITV's London News Network where she hosted London Today and London Tonight as well as a political programme called Seven Days.

In November 2000, Kaplinsky joined Sky News, where she initially co-presented breakfast news programme Sunrise; she later moved to early evening bulletin Live at Five, which she presented alongside Jeremy Thompson.

BBC News
Kaplinsky joined the BBC in November 2002 to present BBC Breakfast from Monday to Thursday with Dermot Murnaghan, before moving on the host the BBC News at Six.

In 2006, Kaplinsky became only the third (and youngest) woman to present the BBC's Ten O'Clock News.

Kaplinsky was recruited from the corporation to join Five to help relaunch the channel.

Five News
On 18 February 2008, Kaplinsky relaunched Five,.

On 21 August 2008, Kaplinsky began her first maternity leave from Five, followed by a second period after the birth of her daughter.

On 14 October 2010, Kaplinsky announced that she was leaving her job at Channel 5 at the end of 2010, having spent most of her three years at the network on maternity leave. On 23 December 2010, she presented her final bulletin for Five News.

ITV
Kaplinsky's first presenting role with ITV was in the summer of 2011, when she hosted a new Sunday entertainment series Born to Shine, which raised awareness for the charity Save the Children, of which Natasha is an ambassador.

In September 2011, she made a return to London Tonight, fronting the programme in place of then lead anchor Nina Hossain. In addition, she occasionally presented numerous ITV News programmes.

On 19 August 2013, Kaplinsky presented The People's Medal, a documentary about The Queen's Birthday Honours List.

On 29 October 2013, Kaplinsky hosted the documentary On the Run, alongside journalist Mark Williams-Thomas. The pair then presented a second documentary, Missing Without Trace, on 12 November 2013.

Strictly Come Dancing

In 2004, Kaplinsky participated in the first series of the celebrity ballroom dancing competition Strictly Come Dancing and went on to win the competition with partner Brendan Cole. Kaplinsky then co-presented the first half of the second series in 2004 with Bruce Forsyth, when regular presenter Tess Daly went on maternity leave. Kaplinsky returned to the show in 2012, taking part in the Christmas Special and in 2018 as part of the BAFTA tribute to Sir Bruce Forsyth.

Personal life
On 21 August 2005, Kaplinsky married Justin Bower. In April 2008, Kaplinsky announced she was pregnant with their first child, six weeks after her debut on Five News. On 25 September 2008, Five News revealed that Kaplinsky had given birth to a son. On 9 April 2010, Kaplinksy gave birth to a daughter. Speaking live on the 14 October 2020 on ITVs This Morning Kaplinsky revealed she had suffered multiple miscarriages and had participated in Channel 5's discussion, Miscarriage: Our Story broadcast 15 October 2020.

On 8 February 2011, Kaplinsky commented in a BBC radio interview on Steve Wright in the Afternoon that she and Bower had performed as disguised extras for the English National Ballet although she "had insisted that her name was not used in the programme". In a production of Romeo and Juliet at the London Coliseum, she performed as "Wench Number 7".

Kaplinsky is teetotal and a vegetarian.

2018 boat accident
In April 2018, Kaplinsky, her father and eight-year-old daughter, Angelica were seriously hurt when the boat they were holidaying in burst into flames off the Greek island of Corfu. The family were rescued by local fishermen, who helped put out a fire that had spread from the engine room and towed them ashore. Kaplinsky's daughter was flown back to Britain for emergency treatment. A Corfu Port Authority spokesman said: 
"The vessel suffered a mechanical failure which caused a fire in the engine room, which was immediately extinguished by the people on the boat." At first the girl was rushed to hospital in Corfu Town with burns to her face and hands. "Her mother and grandfather were treated at a private clinic. It was then decided to fly them home."

Charity
Kaplinsky became a celebrity ambassador for the UK charity Save the Children in 2010. For over a decade she has been an active ambassador and fundraiser for Save the Children, travelling extensively for them around the world.

She is a patron of the Bevern Trust and she is an ambassador for Wellbeing of Women. Kaplinsky is also Patron for the National Maternity Support Foundation and The Willow Foundation.

Kaplinsky volunteered to record 112 testimonies of Holocaust survivors who had never spoken before. She continues to serve as a board member for the Holocaust Memorial Foundation.

She was appointed Officer of the Order of the British Empire (OBE) in the 2017 Birthday Honours for services to the Holocaust Commission.

In October 2018, Kaplinsky and Michael Sheen became vice presidents (an ambassadorial role) of the Royal Society for Public Health (RSPH).

In July 2019, it was announced that Kaplinsky had taken on the role as Barnardo's President. Kaplinsky was welcomed into this position at the annual Parliamentary reception by Javed Khan, CEO of Barnardo's, as well as other celebrity champions. Kaplinsky said, "I'm delighted to be joining Barnardo's as the charity's new President. There are so many challenges for children these days. It must be frightening growing up now. They have so many concerns, environmental changes, the internet, difficulties breaking into jobs, and believing they'll never be affording a house. It's even harder for the most vulnerable children Barnardo's supports – like children growing up in the care system. My aim is to visit as many services as I can and meet as many young people as possible, to learn more about the challenges they face and how the charity is helping them."

References

External links

1972 births
Living people
People from Brighton
English people of South African descent
English people of Belarusian-Jewish descent
Alumni of Hertford College, Oxford
English reporters and correspondents
BBC newsreaders and journalists
ITV regional newsreaders and journalists
ITN newsreaders and journalists
Sky News newsreaders and journalists
5 News presenters and reporters
English television presenters
Strictly Come Dancing winners
Officers of the Order of the British Empire
English Jews
People educated at Varndean College
People from Barcombe